BXH or bxh may refer to:

 BXH, the IATA code for Balkhash Airport, Kazakhstan
 BXH, the National Rail station code for Bexleyheath railway station, London, England
 bxh, the ISO 639-3 code for Buhutu language, Milne Bay Province, Papua New Guinea